John "Johnny" Lawless (born 3 November 1974) is a rugby league footballer who played in the 1990s and 2000s. He played at representative level for England, and Ireland, and at club level for Halifax (two spells), Sheffield Eagles and Huddersfield-Sheffield Giants.

Club career
Lawless started his career at Halifax, making his début in 1992. He joined Sheffield Eagles in 1995. Lawless played  in Sheffield Eagles' 17–8 victory over Wigan in the 1998 Challenge Cup Final during Super League III at Wembley Stadium, London on Saturday 2 May 1998.

After spending the season with Huddersfield following the club's merger with Sheffield, Lawless returned to Halifax in 2000. He retired in January 2004. Since retirement, Johnny has gone on to found, Minds Matter, a company who delivers Mental Health First Aid training, the company's main aims are to spread Mental Health Awareness and reduce Stigma. Along with his Colleague, Johnny has presented across Britain to both healthcare and non-healthcare establishments.

Representative career
Lawless was an Ireland international and played at the 2000 Rugby League World Cup.

References

External links
(archived by web.archive.org) The Teams: Ireland

Living people
Ireland national rugby league team players
England national rugby league team players
1974 births
Rugby league hookers
Halifax R.L.F.C. players
Sheffield Eagles (1984) players